The Ban laomakkha mine is one of the largest gypsum mines in Laos. The mine is in Savannakhet Province. The mine has reserves amounting to 42 million tonnes of gypsum.

References 

Gypsum mines in Laos